Andrea Dandolo (died September 1298), noble of Venice, was the commander of the Venetian fleet that confronted the Genoan fleet in the Battle of Curzola (8 September 1298), which ended in disaster for the Venetians.  During this battle Marco Polo, in command of one of the ninety-eight Venetian galleys, was captured – it was during this imprisonment that he began to write his Travels.  Andrea was also captured by the Genoese; contemporary historians report that "Andrea Dandolo, being unable to bear the disgrace of such defeat, beating his head against the wooden hull of the galley taking him to prison, killed himself", depriving the Genoese of the satisfaction of executing him.

13th-century Venetian people
Republic of Venice admirals
Italian military personnel who committed suicide
1298 deaths
Andrea, Admiral
Year of birth unknown
Medieval admirals
People of the War of Curzola